Notable people bearing the name Nishad include:

 K. K. Nishad (born 1978), Indian playback singer
 Mahendra Prasad Nishad (born 1967), Indian politician
 Vishambhar Prasad Nishad (born 1962), Indian politician
 Jai Narain Prasad Nishad (1930–2018), Indian politician
 Kajal Nishad (born 1982), Indian actress
 Jamuna Nishad (1953–2010), Indian politician
 Ajay Nishad ( born 1966),Indian politician
 Mukesh Sahni (born 1981),Indian Politician

See also 
Nishad, an Indian caste